Frederick Lee Hall (July 24, 1916 – March 18, 1970) was an American lawyer and politician who served as the 31st lieutenant governor of Kansas from 1951 to 1955 and 33rd governor of Kansas from 1955 until 1957. He was a member of the Republican Party.

Biography
Hall was born in Dodge City and graduated from Dodge City High School where his participation on the debate team and his academic achievements earned him a scholarship to the University of Southern California. While attending U.S.C., he was a member of the International Debating Team, finished his B.A. degree in 1938, stayed on and earned his J.D. degree. He married Leadell Schneider and they had one child.

Career
During World War II, Hall enlisted and was rejected when he failed to pass his physical. From 1942 to 1944, he served as an assistant director of the Combined Production and Resources Board, coordinating production planning with Britain and Canada, and based in Washington.

Hall established his law practice in Topeka and Dodge City and served as the Ford County attorney from 1947 to 1949. Elected Lieutenant Governor of Kansas, he served from 1951 to 1955.

Elected in 1954, Hall was sworn into the governorship on January 10, 1955. During his tenure, the director of the state purchasing agency was fired, a high school aid law was authorized, a water resource commission was organized, and a "right to work" bill was vetoed.

Hall resigned to become a justice of Kansas Supreme Court in 1957  after being defeated in the primary for re-election to office, in what is known as the "triple-play of 1956". Warren Shaw defeated Hall in the Republican primary for governor, and Shaw lost the subsequent Gubernatorial general election to Democrat George Docking. Sitting Chief Justice Bill Smitha strong supporter of Hallwas seriously ill and contemplating a retirement from his position as Chief Justice; however, he was concerned that if he retired after Docking took office in January 1957, Docking would appoint a Democrat as chief justice. Smith, Hall, and Lieutenant Governor John McCuish devised a plan to prevent this from happening. Chief Justice Smith resigned effective January 3, 1957. Smith's resignation was quickly followed by Governor Hall's resignation also effective on January 3, 1957. As a result of Hall's resignation, Lieutenant Governor McCuish was sworn in as Kansas Governor. On the same day Walter G. Thiele became Chief Justice and Hall replaced Thiel as an associate justice of the Kansas Supreme Court.  Thiel left the court the same day Docking became governor and Jay S. Parker replaced Thiel as chief justice.

Hall served on the Supreme Court bench until April 7, 1958, when he resigned to again run for the governorship where he lost the primary. Defeated in his bid, he retired from politics and moved to California where he became an executive in the management control of the Aerojet General Corporation.

Hall served as the president of the California Republican Assembly He was elected to the position at the organization's 1962 convention.

In 1964, he ran for the Republican nomination for the 1964 United States Senate election in California, losing to George Murphy, a retired Hollywood star.

He returned later to Dodge City and resumed his law practice.

Death and legacy
He was a member of the Methodist Church and a member of Phi Kappa Tau fraternity and elected to a term on the Phi Kappa Tau National Council in 1956.  Hall died at Shawnee and is interred at Maple Grove Cemetery in Dodge City.

References

External links
 
The Political Graveyard
National Governors Association
Publications concerning Kansas Governor Hall's administration available via the KGI Online Library

 

1916 births
1970 deaths
People from Dodge City, Kansas
University of Southern California alumni
Kansas lawyers
Republican Party governors of Kansas
Justices of the Kansas Supreme Court
Lieutenant Governors of Kansas
20th-century American lawyers
USC Gould School of Law alumni
20th-century American judges
American United Methodists
20th-century Methodists
California Republicans